Nilai University (Nilai U) received full 'university' status and is a private university in Nilai, Seremban District, Negeri Sembilan, Malaysia. The medium of instruction is English. Nilai U has three faculties offering diploma, bachelor's degree, master's degree and PhD programmes.

Campus and student population
Its  campus is 20 minutes from Kuala Lumpur International Airport and is a half hour drive away from the capital's city center.  

Local students and international applicants make up approximately 35% of its student population. The international students hail from 40 countries, which include Sri Lanka, China, Kazakhstan, Nigeria, Bangladesh and Cambodia.

Faculties
 Centre for Foundation Studies
 Centre for Postgraduate Studies
 Faculty of Applied Sciences
 Faculty of Business
 Faculty of Engineering and Technology
 Faculty of Hospitality & Tourism
 Faculty of Humanities & Social Sciences

Centre for Foundation Studies
These programmes are pre-university courses equivalent to A-levels or Malaysian STPM.

Programmes:
 Foundation in Business
 Foundation in Science

Faculty of Applied Sciences
The faculty of Allied Health Sciences was established in Nilai University in 2006. Its stated primary objective is to produce highly competent practitioners in the health related sciences. There are three programs offered under this school: Bachelor of Science (Hons) in Nursing, Diploma in Nursing, and Diploma in Medical Laboratory Technology. The Bachelor of Biomedical Science program is expected to be launched soon.

Faculty of Business
The Faculty of Business is one of the biggest faculties at Nilai University with a population of more than 800 students. Student are from Malaysia, China, India, Bangladesh, Pakistan, Kazakhstan, Yemen, Equatorial Guinea, Zimbabwe, and many other countries.

Faculty of Engineering & Technology
The Faculty of Engineering and Technology is headed by a dean and supported by four heads of department and the programme coordinators.

The Department of Aircraft Maintenance Engineering is one of the biggest under the Engineering faculty. Aircraft Maintenance Engineering is one of the leading courses at Nilai University. It has complete hangar and equipment for students to do their practical work. The students range from Malaysia, China, Africa, Sri Lanka, India, Bangladesh, and other countries.

Faculty of Hospitality and Tourism
The Faculty of Hospitality and Tourism has six kitchens and a 100-seat formal dining restaurant.

Faculty of Humanities and Social Sciences
The Faculty of Humanities and Social Sciences comprises the departments of Languages and Social Sciences. The faculty offers two programmes – the Intensive English Programme and the American Degree Program.

Ownership
Nilai U is owned by Nilai Education Sdn Bhd with the Federal Land Development Authority of Malaysia (FELDA) having a 30% stake in the university.

See also 
 Education in Malaysia

References

External links 
 Official site
 Partnership Articulation Between the American Degree Program at Nilai university, Malaysia and Montana State University

 
Business schools in Malaysia
1997 establishments in Malaysia
Educational institutions established in 1997
Private universities and colleges in Malaysia